James Hanks may refer to:

 James M. Hanks (1833–1909), U.S. Representative from Arkansas
 James Hanks (rugby union) (born 1984), English rugby union player